is a 1967 Japanese film directed by Nagisa Ōshima.

Plot
Nejiko is a sex-obsessed girl. She happens to see yakuza members digging guns and swords buried underground and is imprisoned by them.

Cast
 Keiko Sakurai : Nejiko
 Taiji Tonoyama : Omocha(Toy)
 Hōsei Komatsu : Oni(Demon)
 Kei Satō : Otoko
 Masakazu Tamura : Boy
 Rokkō Toura : Televi(Television)

References

External links
 
 Double Suicide: Japanese Summer at Schochiku

Films directed by Nagisa Ōshima
1960s Japanese-language films
Shochiku films
1960s Japanese films